The Last Princess is a 2008 Chinese television series.

Plot
This story takes place during the end of the Qing Dynasty and centers on the love story between princess Yunxiang and Wen Liangyu. Separated the night they'd planned to elope, Yunxiang was rescued by an enemy of the imperial family, Fang Tianyu. Tianyu falls for Yunxiang and frequently comes between Yunxiang and Liangyu, going as far as plotting to kill Liangyu. Yunxiang thinks Liangyu has perished and tries to kill Tianyu for revenge, but ends up on death row. Wealthy official Shen Shihao also loves Yunxiang and saves her, at which time Yunxiang discovers she's pregnant with Liangyu's child. She marries Shihao in gratitude. Eighteen years later, Liangyu returns as Beijing's most prominent mob ringleader. Unbeknownst to him, his son with Yunxiang, Shen Zikang, has grown up and become a police captain dead set on capturing Liangyu. Further complicating things, Zikang falls in love with Tianyu's daughter Yuyan, but she loves Liangyu.

Alternate plot synopsis
During the Qing Dynasty, a prostitute decides to dress up her daughter, Li Kaixin, as a boy in attempt to prevent her from following the same path as she did, and become a prostitute like her. The attempt is unsuccessful. Years later, Kaixin is well known throughout the capital as the most popular courtesan.

Grown up, Kaixin makes a sudden decision in order to help her mother repay her gambling debts, which is to marry a rich eunuch. To her horror, he tries to violate her on their wedding night. To protect herself, Kaixin murders her new husband. At the same time, Kaixin's mother reunites with her husband, who happens to be a wealthy government official. Not long, Kaixin is married again. This time, it is due to her wealthy father, who marries her off to Fang Tianyu. However, with Kaixin's first love, Wen Liangyu returning home, drama ensues.

Cast
 Huo Siyan as Yunxiang
 Sammul Chan as Wen Liangyu
 Yan Yikuan as Fang Tianyu
 Sun Xing as Shen Shihao
 Leila Tong as Li Kaixin
 Cheng Lisha as Pan Nianru
 Florence Tan as Hua Yuerong
 Xu Guiying as Yu Qin
 Tian Zhenwei as Shen Zikang
 Liu Jia as Fang Yuyan / Bai Rihong
 Cheng Sihan as Commander Pang
 Gao Lei as Ming Jiu
 Zhong Liang as Zhou Dabao
 Hei Jinghuan as Chun Hong
 Chen Jiaxin as child Fang Yuyan
 Shen Baoping as Fu Lun
 Zhu Zhonghe as Fang Qing Hai
 Zhao Qiang as Liu Gongzi
 Xu Min as Hua Mama
 Lu Enhua as Wan'er

References

External links
  The Last Princess on Sina.com

Television series set in the Qing dynasty
2008 Chinese television series debuts
2008 Chinese television series endings
Chinese romance television series
Mandarin-language television shows